Gustavus Miller Bower (December 12, 1790 – November 17, 1864) was an American U.S. Representative from Missouri.

Born near Culpeper, Virginia, Bower attended the public schools.
He studied medicine in Philadelphia, Pennsylvania, moved to Kentucky prior to 1812 and resided near Nicholasville. He then enlisted during the War of 1812 as a surgeon-dresser.
He was one of the few survivors of the massacre at Frenchtown, near Detroit, January 23, 1813.
He moved to Monroe County, Missouri, in 1833, settling near Paris, and engaged in the practice of medicine as well as agricultural pursuits.

Bower was elected as a Democrat to the Twenty-eighth Congress (March 4, 1843 – March 3, 1845).
Afterwards, he resumed the practice of medicine.
He died near Paris, Missouri, November 17, 1864.
He was interred in the family burial ground north of Paris, Missouri.

References

1790 births
1864 deaths
People from Culpeper County, Virginia
American military personnel of the War of 1812
People from Paris, Missouri
Democratic Party members of the United States House of Representatives from Missouri
19th-century American politicians
American slave owners